The politics of Tanzania takes place in a framework of a unitary presidential democratic republic, whereby the President of Tanzania is both head of state and head of government, and of a multi-party system. Executive power is exercised by the government. Legislative power is vested in both the government and parliament. The party system is dominated by the Chama Cha Mapinduzi (Revolutionary State Party). The Judiciary is independent of the executive and the legislature.

Political conditions
Full independence came in December 1961 and Julius Kambarage Nyerere (1922–1999), a socialist leader who led Tanganyika from colonial rule, was elected President in 1961.  One of Africa’s most respected figures, Julius Nyerere was seen as a politician of principle and intelligence. Known as Mwalimu (teacher), he proposed a widely acclaimed vision of education.

From independence in 1961 until the mid-1980s, Tanzania was a one-party state, with a socialist model of economic development. Beginning in the mid-1980s, under the administration of President Ali Hassan Mwinyi, Tanzania undertook a number of political and economic reforms. In January and February 1992, the government decided to adopt multiparty democracy. Legal and constitutional changes led to the registration of 11 political parties. Two parliamentary by-elections in early 1994, both won by Chama Cha Mapinduzi (CCM), were the first-ever multiparty elections in Tanzanian history.

In October 2000, Tanzania held its second multi-party general elections. The ruling CCM party’s candidate, Benjamin W. Mkapa, defeated his three main rivals, winning the presidential election with 71% of the vote. In the parliamentary elections, CCM won 202 of the 232 elected seats. In the Zanzibar presidential election, Abeid Amani Karume, the son of former President Abeid Karume, defeated CUF candidate Seif Shariff Hamad. The election was marred by irregularities, and subsequent political violence claimed at least 23 lives in January 2001, mostly on Pemba island, where police used tear gas and bullets against demonstrators. Hundreds were injured, and state forces were reported to have attacked boats of refugees fleeing to Kenya. Also, 16 CUF members were expelled from the Union Parliament after boycotting the legislature to protest the Zanzibar election results.

In October 2001, the CCM and the CUF parties signed a reconciliation agreement which called for electoral reforms and set up a Commission of Inquiry to investigate the deaths that occurred in January 2001 on Pemba. The agreement also led to the President appointment of an additional CUF official to become a member of the Union Parliament. Changes to the Zanzibar Constitution in April 2002 allowed both the CCM and CUF parties to nominate members to the Zanzibar Electoral Commission. In May 2003, the Zanzibar Electoral Commission conducted by-elections to fill vacant seats in the parliament, including those seats vacated by the CUF boycott. Observers considered these by-elections, the first major test of the reconciliation agreement, to be free, fair, and peaceful. President Mkapa, Vice President Ali Mohamed Shein, Prime Minister Frederick Sumaye, and National Assembly members will serve until the next general elections in 2005. Similarly, Zanzibar President Karume and members of the Zanzibar House of Representatives also will complete their terms of office in 2005.

, Tanzania was ranked Partly Free by Freedom House. The 2011 Democracy Index marked Tanzania as a "hybrid regime", ranking it 90th out of 167, an improvement from 92nd the year before, but preceding a decline on a number of metrics as shown in subsequent Freedom House studies. By 2018, many of the factors taken into account by Freedom House had undergone a small but significant decline, with the most recent reports citing a marked deterioration in the rights of civil society and reduced the abilities of political opposition to criticize the Magufuli regime. Tanzania remains in the "Partly free" category as of 2018.

According to Human Rights Watch since the election of President John Magufuli in December 2015, Tanzania has witnessed a marked decline in respect for free expression, association and assembly.

On 19 March 2021, Vice President Samia Suluhu Hassan became the new president after the sudden death of President John Magufuli. She is the first female President of Tanzania.

Executive branch

|President
| Samia Suluhu
| Chama Cha Mapinduzi
| 19 March 2021
|-
|Prime Minister
|Majaliwa Kassim Majaliwa
|Chama Cha Mapinduzi
|20 November 2015
|-
|Vice-President of Tanzania
|Philip Mpango
|Chama Cha Mapinduzi
|31 March 2021
|}
Tanzania's president is elected by direct popular vote for a 5-year term. The president appoints a prime minister who serves as the government's leader in the National Assembly. The president selects his cabinet from among National Assembly members. The Constitution also empowers him to nominate 10 non-elected members of Parliament, who also are eligible to become cabinet members.

Legislative branch

The unicameral National Assembly of Tanzania or Bunge has 393 seats — 264 elected by popular vote, 113 allocated to women chosen by their parties in proportion to their share of the electoral vote, 10 nominated by the president, five members chosen by the Zanzibar House of Representatives, and the Attorney General as an ex officio member — all members serving five-year terms. In addition to enacting laws that apply to the entire United Republic of Tanzania, the Assembly enacts laws that apply only to the mainland. Zanzibar has its own House of Representatives to make laws especially for Zanzibar (the Zanzibar House of Representatives has 70 seats, directly elected by universal suffrage to serve five-year terms).

Wikipedia has a list of current members of the Bunge arranged in two ways, alphabetically by member and alphabetically by constituency.

Tanzania's National Assembly members are elected concurrently by direct popular vote for 5-year terms. The unicameral National Assembly elected in 2000 had 295 members. These 295 members included the Attorney General, five members elected from the Zanzibar House of Representatives to participate in the Parliament, the 48 special women's seats which were made up of 20% of the seats a particular party had in the House, 181 constituents seats of members of Parliament from the mainland, and 50 seats from Zanzibar, as well as seats for the 10 members of Parliament nominated by the President.  The ruling CCM holds about 86% of the seats in the Assembly elected in 2005, and held 93% of seats in the previous Assembly elected in 2000.

Laws passed by the National Assembly are valid for Zanzibar only in specifically designated union matters. Zanzibar's House of Representatives has jurisdiction over all non-union matters. There are currently 76 members in the House of Representatives in Zanzibar, including 50 elected by the people, 10 appointed by the president of Zanzibar, 5 exofficio members, and an attorney general appointed by the president. In May 2002, the government increased the number of special seats allocated to women from 10 to 15, which will increase the number of House of Representatives members to 81. Ostensibly, Zanzibar's House of Representatives can make laws for Zanzibar without the approval of the union government as long as it does not involve union-designated matters. The terms of office for Zanzibar's president and House of Representatives also are 5 years. The semiautonomous relationship between Zanzibar and the union is a relatively unique system of government.

Political parties and elections

Chama Cha Mapinduzi or CCM (Revolutionary Party) - Benjamin Mkapa
Civic United Front or CUF - Seif Shariff Hamad
Chama cha Democracia na Maendeleo or CHADEMA - Freeman Aikaeli Mbowe (chairman)
Tanzania Labour Party or TLP - Augustine Lyatonga Mrema
United Democratic Party or UDP - John Cheyo
Democratic Party (unregistered) - Reverend Christopher Mtikila
National Convention for Construction and Reform-Mageuzi or NCCR-Mageuzi - James Mbatia
Union for Multiparty Democracy or UMD - Abdullah Fundikira

Judicial branch
Tanzania has a five-level judiciary, which comprises the jurisdictions of tribal, Islamic, and British common law.

In mainland Tanzania, appeal is from the Primary Courts through the District Courts and Resident Magistrate Courts, to the High Courts, ending in the federal Court of Appeal. The Zanzibar court system parallels the legal system of Mainland Tanzania, and all cases tried in Zanzibari courts, except for those involving constitutional issues and Islamic law, can be appealed to the Court of Appeals of the union.

The Judges of the Court of Appeal and the High Court are appointed by the President. Judges of more junior courts are appointed by the Chief Justice.

A commercial court was established in September 1999 as a division of the High Court.

Administrative divisions

For administrative purposes, Tanzania is divided into 30 regions—25 in the mainland and 5 on Zanzibar. Ninety-nine districts have been created to further increase local authority. These districts are also now referred to as local government authorities. Currently there are 114 councils operating in 99 districts, 22 are urban and 92 are rural. The 22 urban units are classified further as city (Dar es Salaam and Mwanza), municipal (Arusha, Bukoba, Dodoma, Iringa, Kigoma-Ujiji, Lindi, Moshi, Mbeya, Morogoro, Musoma, Mtwara-Mikindani, Singida, Shinyanga, Tabora, and Tanga), and town councils.

References

External links
Tanzania Parliament
EAC East African Community
State House
Prime Minister's Office

Dar Helped Kick out Amin, so why isn’t Uganda More Grateful? by Charles Onyango-Obbo, The East African, May 18, 2009

Ministries
Agriculture and Food Security
Education and Culture
Finance
Health
Natural Resources and Tourism
Science, Technology and Higher Education
Works